The SDM Institute for Management Development (SDMIMD) is a business school in Mysore, Karnataka at the foothills of Chamundi Hill. It was established in 1993. It is business school with ACBSP, EFMD, NBA, AICTE accreditations and it is also a AACSB and BSIS member.

It is part of  Shri Dharmasthala Manjunatheswara Educational Trust, Ujire. It reflects high values and character that the founder Dharmadhikari Dr.  D. Veerendra Heggade (who was awarded  Padma Bhushan Award (in 2000) and Padma Vibhushan (in 2015) along side numerous accolades by the Government of India for his social work and contribution to society in various dimensions).

SDMIMD is internationally recognised as a unique institution that has pioneered a philosophy of management education and governance that is Indian in ethos and character and global in relevance. It has a rich and celebrated bouquet of faculties who focus on imparting courses relevant to the current industry requirement. It is also noticeable that the campus was awarded for its architectural design in the segment of Award for Best Institutional/Corporate Building Design Southern Region. SDMIMD Campus has been listed in one of the Gorgeous College Campuses You Have To Visit In India by Buzzfeed.com .

The college consistently maintained a 100% placement record for several years for its PGDM programme.

Academic programmes
 Post Graduate Diploma in Management (PGDM)
 Certificate Program in Business Management (CPBM)
 Management Development Program (MDP)
 Doctoral Program [Ph.D.]

References

External links
 

1993 establishments in Karnataka
Business schools in Karnataka
Educational institutions established in 1993
Universities and colleges in Mysore